Adela Šajn (born ) is a Slovenian female artistic gymnast, representing her nation at international competitions. She participated at the 2008 Summer Olympics in Beijing, China.

References

1990 births
Living people
Slovenian female artistic gymnasts
Place of birth missing (living people)
Gymnasts at the 2008 Summer Olympics
Olympic gymnasts of Slovenia
European Games competitors for Slovenia
Gymnasts at the 2019 European Games